The Mistaken Point Formation is a geologic formation in Newfoundland and Labrador. It is recognized as a Lagerstätte preserving fossils dating back to the Ediacaran period.

Geology
Mistaken Point Formation includes many fine ash-beds, which are a good source of zircons used in the uranium-lead method of radiometric dating, allowing the site to be confidently dated to approximately 565 million years old.

These fine-grained volcanic ash beds also preserve finely detailed fossils.

Fossils

Mistaken Point contains the some of the oldest ediacaran biota in an Avalon-type assemblage. They are commonly categorized as Spindle-shaped (Fractofusus), Frond-shaped(Charniodiscus), or Bush-like / Radiating (Bradgatia) in form. Spindles are the most common fossils in the assemblage. Other forms do exist, such as the conical Thectardis.

Some of the forms here appear to survive until the extinction of the Ediacaran biota at the base of the Cambrian. The evolutionary history of these forms is unknown, though hypotheses exist.

Discovery of Ediacaran fossils in the Avalon Peninsula 

In the summer of 1967, Shiva Balak Misra, an Indian graduate student (1966–69) at Newfoundland's Memorial University discovered a rich assemblage of imprints of soft bodied organisms on the surface of large rock slabs, while mapping the Conception Group of Avalon Peninsula of Newfoundland near Cape Race, at a place called Mistaken Point.

These unusual impressions of previously unknown soft-bodied sea animals on the surfaces of argillites (mudstone) included coelenterates and other metazoa of the Ediacarian period, 575 to 560 million years ago.   These fossils are records of the oldest known complex life forms that existed anywhere on Earth. Misra was the first to prepare and present a systematic geological map of the region, to classify and describe the rock sequence of the area and to work out the depositional history of the rocks.

The description of the fossil assemblage together with their mode of occurrence, the cause of sudden death, ecological conditions and chronological position form part of Misra's detailed thesis submitted for the degree of Master of Science. The discovery was reported in a 1968 letter to Nature. Misra described the Mistaken Point fauna in detail in 1969, in a paper published in the Bulletin of the Geological Society of America. He sorted the fossil assemblage into five groups, namely spindle-shaped, leaf-shaped, round lobate, dendrite like, and radiating. Each group was defined in terms of distribution and form, sub-categories and biological affinity.

The geological environment of the fossil-bearing rocks and the ecology of the animals that lived and died in the Conception Sea were described by Misra in two of his subsequent papers published in the Bulletin of the Geological Society of America in 1971 and in the Journal of the Geological Society of India in 1981. Mistaken Point Ecological Reserve is a  5.7-square kilometer area of the coast that protects the fossils.

The sudden appearance of Ediacaran soft bodied organisms in the Mistaken Point assemblage has been called the ‘Ediacaran Explosion’ or 'Avalon Explosion'

See also

 List of fossiliferous stratigraphic units in Newfoundland and Labrador
 Lagerstätte

References
 

Ediacaran Newfoundland and Labrador